Senate elections were held in Kazakhstan on 28 June 2017. All 16 seats representing the regions of Kazakhstan were elected by the local legislative bodies (maslihats). 3242 of the 3293 eligible electorates voted in the election.

Electoral system 
The members of the Senate of Kazakhstan are nonpartisan and are indirectly elected by the local legislative bodies Maslihats every six years. Each of the fourteen region and cities of Almaty and Astana are represented by two senators while 15 senators are appointed by the President of Kazakhstan.

Results

National

Akmola Region

Aktobe Region

Almaty

Almaty Region

Astana

Atyrau Region

East Kazakhstan Region

Jambyl Region

Karaganda Region

Kostanay Region

Kyzylorda Region

Mangystau Region

North Kazakhstan Region

Pavlodar Region

South Kazakhstan Region

West Kazakhstan Region

References

Kazakhstan
Elections in Kazakhstan
2017 in Kazakhstan
June 2017 events in Asia
June 2017 events in Kazakhstan